SlamNation is a documentary film by director Paul Devlin.  The film follows the National Poetry Slam in Portland, Oregon.

It follows the 1996 Nuyorican Poetry Slam team (Saul Williams, Beau Sia, muMs da Schemer and Jessica Care Moore) as they competed at the 1996 National Poetry Slam held in Portland, OR. The film also features performances by Marc Smith, Patricia Smith, Taylor Mali, Alexandra Oliver and Bob Holman, among many others.

The film is one of the first films to document the art and competition of the poetry slam: a spoken word competition where judges, randomly chosen from the audience, score poets on a scale from one to ten and the poet with the highest score at the end of the evening wins.

SlamNation premiered at the 1998 SXSW Film Festival and was awarded Best Documentary at the 1998 Northampton Independent Film Festival. SlamNation was broadcast on Cinemax/HBO and Starz/Encore, 2000–2002.

Though it would only enjoy a limited theatrical run, the film was nonetheless critically well received. Roger Ebert wrote a glowing review, calling the poetry slam "a pop culture phenomenon". In her book Words In Your Face: A Guided Tour Through Twenty Years of the New York City Poetry Slam, author Cristin O'Keefe Aptowicz calls the film "slam's second bible" (behind the Nuyorican anthology Aloud) and writes,

References

External links
 SlamNation official website
 
 New York Times review of SlamNation

Documentary films about poets
American documentary films
Works about slam poetry
1998 films
1990s English-language films
1990s American films